The UN-Habitat Scroll of Honour Award was created by the United Nations Centre for Human Settlements (UNCHS) in 1989 to encourage and recognize the countries, governments, organizations, and individuals who have made great contributions to the development of housing. It is the most prestigious human settlements award in the world by the United Nations, given by the United Nations Human Settlements Programme (UN-Habitat), and has recognized 192 initiatives since its launch in 1989.

The aim of the award is to honour and acknowledge initiatives which have made outstanding contributions in the field of human settlements, provision of housing, highlighting the plight of people living in poverty or who have been displaced, developing, and improving human settlements and the quality of urban life to leave no one behind echoing the Sustainable Development Goals 2030 with emphasis on Goal 11: Sustainable Cities and Communities.

The award, a plaque engraved with the name of the winner, is handed over at the Global Observance of the World Habitat Day, the day the United Nations has set aside to remind the world that we all have the power and the responsibility to reflect on the state of our cities and towns and to shape the future. World Habitat Day was established in 1985 by the United Nations General Assembly through Resolution 40/202 and was first celebrated in 1986.

Eligibility 
Individuals, organizations, the private sector, government, non-governmental, bilateral and multi-lateral aid agencies dealing with sustainable projects which have had great impact in society, and any Habitat Agenda partner who has improved the lives of people can be nominated for the UN-Habitat Scroll of Honour.

Evaluation criteria 
A Committee comprising from UN-Habitat experts and senior management makes the initial assessment of the nominations and submissions of the candidates and verify that the submission conforms to the standards outlined in the guidelines. After strict reviewing and screening materials of all the candidates, the United Nations Human Settlements Programme chooses the winners.  In the past, every year the number of awards by the United Nations Human Settlements Programme depends, generally below ten. Since 2018 only five winners, ideally from each Region of the world, are selected. Past winners are outstanding in the international, regional or national level of human living and have extensive influences. On every World Habitat Day, the United Nations Human Settlements Programme will hold the award ceremony in a prior selected city.

Winners 
Each year, the United Nations Human Settlements Programme receives a large number of projects nominated by governments after selection. Recommended candidates can be government organizations or agencies, individuals, or projects, and initiatives can address any aspects of human settlements, such as housing, infrastructure, urban renewal, sustainable human settlements development, or post-disaster reconstruction.

2022
Awards were given to the following:

2021
Awards were given to the following:

2020
Awards were given to the following:

2018
Awards were given to the following:

2013
Awards were given to the following:

2012
Awards were given to the following:

2011
Awards were given to:

2010

2009
The award recipients came from diverse backgrounds and contents:

2008

2007

2006

2005

2004

2003

2002

2001

2000

1999

1998

1997

1996

1995

1994

1993

1992

1991

1990

1989

See also
United Nations Human Settlements Programme

References

External links
World Habitat Day
2009 Scroll of Honour Award Winners
2010 UN-HABITAT Scroll of Honour Award Winners
2018 UN-HABITAT Scroll of Honour Award Winners
2018 UN-HABITAT Scroll of Honour Award Winner Video
United Nations Documents

Awards established in 1989
United Nations Development Group
United Nations General Assembly subsidiary organs
United Nations awards
Urban geography
Human settlement
Urbanization
United Nations Human Settlements Programme